Graziella "Lalla" Romano (11 November 1906 in Demonte – 26 June 2001 in Milan) was an Italian novelist, poet, artist and journalist.

Life and work 
Romano was born as Graziella Romano in Demonte in 1906 from a noteworthy Piedmontese family. Her great-uncle was mathematician and glottologist Giuseppe Peano. Romano was originally interested in painting. She attended the University of Turin where she studied with art historian Lionello Venturi before Cesare Pavese piqued her interest in writing. She graduated with a degree in literature then worked as a librarian and teacher. In those years she started dating Giovanni Ermiglia, a philosophy student from Sanremo, and wrote several poems dedicated to him which have been later collected together with other previous unpublished texts in Poesie per Giovanni (2007). During World War II she joined with the Resistance. After the war she became noted for writings that drew on personal and family experiences.

Legacy
Romano continued to paint throughout her life. In 2009, a retrospective of her paintings was held in Aosta. Her former house in Milan has been converted to a museum to preserve her work.

Partial bibliography

Novels 

Le metamorfosi, Turin, 1951;
Maria, Turin, 1953; 
Tetto murato, Turin, 1957;
Diario di Grecia, Padua, 1960; 
L'uomo che parlava solo, Turin, 1961; 
La penombra che abbiamo attraversato, Turin, 1964; 
Le parole tra noi leggere, Turin, 1969; (winner of the Strega Prize)
L'ospite, Turin, 1973 ;
Una giovinezza inventata, Turin, 1979;
Inseparabile, Turin, 1981;
Nei mari estremi, Turin, 1987;
Un sogno del Nord, Turin, 1989.

Poetry 
Fiore, Turin, 1941;
L'autunno, Milan, 1955; 
Giovane è il tempo, Turin, 1974.
Poesie per Giovanni, Ventimiglia, 2007.

Notes

References 

1906 births
2001 deaths
People from Demonte
Italian women journalists
Italian women poets
Strega Prize winners
Italian women novelists
20th-century Italian poets
20th-century Italian novelists
20th-century Italian women writers
20th-century Italian women artists
Italian painters
Italian contemporary artists